Radnor Friends Meetinghouse is a historic Quaker meeting house on Sproul and Conestoga Roads in Radnor Township, Delaware County, Pennsylvania.

In 1686, there were sufficient number of Friends in Radnor township to begin meetings at the house of John Jerman, a Quaker minister.  The current meeting house was built in 1717 with an addition made several years later. An earlier meeting house existed on the site as early as 1693. During the Revolutionary War, the meeting house was used as an outpost for General George Washington's Continental Army.

The meeting house added to the National Register of Historic Places in 1978.

Worship services are held weekly at 10am.

See also
National Register of Historic Places listings in Delaware County, Pennsylvania

References

External links

Radnor Monthly Meeting History
Radnor Friends Meeting House, Southwest corner of Sproul & Conestoga Roads, Ithan, Delaware County, PA: 20 photos, 2 color transparencies, 4 measured drawings, 19 data pages, and 2 photo caption pages at Historic American Buildings Survey

Quaker meeting houses in Pennsylvania
Churches on the National Register of Historic Places in Pennsylvania
Churches completed in 1717
18th-century Quaker meeting houses
Churches in Delaware County, Pennsylvania
National Register of Historic Places in Delaware County, Pennsylvania
1717 establishments in Pennsylvania